801 Seventh Avenue S.W., commonly known as the Nexen Building, is a high rise office building in downtown Calgary, Alberta, Canada.

It is a 37-storey skyscraper, with a height of 153 m (502 ft). It was designed by CPV Group Architects and Engineers Ltd and built by CANA Construction Company Limited. The late-modernist building was completed in 1982.

The Nexen Building employs a composite stub-girder steel-frame floor system, originally developed in part by Joseph Colaco.

It is unique in that it is one of the few buildings in Calgary that do not follow the traditional grid pattern of the downtown core. Instead of facing south–north, or east–west, it stands diagonally.

Tenants

The original tenant of the Nexen Building was the NOVA Corporation. In 2000, the building became Nexen's headquarters. Nexen was purchased by Chinese state-owned CNOOC in 2013 and reduced its workforce over time.

Nexen moved from the Nexen Building in 2019, instead subleasing 8 floors of The Bow from Cenovus, leaving the Nexen Building the largest-ever completely vacant building in downtown Calgary.

See also
List of tallest buildings in Calgary

References

Buildings and structures in Calgary
Skyscrapers in Calgary
1982 establishments in Alberta
Skyscraper office buildings in Canada
Office buildings completed in 1982